Dublin City Football Club was a former Irish association football club based in Northside, Dublin. The club played in the League of Ireland. They were formed in 1999 after a split within Home Farm Everton  and they originally played as  Home Farm Fingal before changing their name for the 2001–02 season. They disbanded in 2006 due to financial problems.

History 
Home Farm is one of the biggest junior football clubs in Ireland and their senior team, from 1970 up to the late 1990s, played in the League of Ireland. However, the link between Home Farm and the senior team was severed in the late 1990s. The senior side was briefly known as Home Farm Fingal in an effort to identify it with the north Dublin area. In 1999 Home Farm Fingal CEO Ronan Seery took over the club and renamed it "Dublin City". The club was based in Dublin and in 2006, its final year of operation, played their home matches at Dalymount Park. The last manager was Dermot Keely.

Nicknamed "The Vikings", they adopted the same colours as the Dublin GAA team. Their shirt sponsor was Carroll's of Dublin, a chain of tourist souvenir shops which sold club-branded merchandise at its stores in the city centre and Dublin Airport.

The club were twice promoted to the League of Ireland Premier Division, winning the 2003 League of Ireland First Division and then defeating Shamrock Rovers in a promotion/relegation play-off in 2005. In addition to its small following, the club had no permanent home ground, playing at various times in Tolka Park, Dalymount Park, Morton Stadium, Richmond Park and Whitehall Stadium.  However they failed to cultivate a significant fan-base. Some very low attendances were reported at their games. As a result of these factors, the club experienced financial problems and as of July 19, 2006, Dublin City FC ceased trading and resigned from the league. The results of all their games to that point in the season were expunged from the record.

Ronan Seery issued a statement saying, "Due to ongoing difficulties, our continued existence within the Eircom League simply became untenable and while extremely difficult to make, it is the most prudent and honourable decision and course of action to take."  However, the club was heavily criticised in some quarters, for example by Damien Richardson and Roddy Collins for failing to complete their league fixtures. Roddy Collins, who managed Dublin City in 2004 but left abruptly on bad terms, called the club's actions "disgraceful."

Honours 
League of Ireland First Division
Winners: 2003
Runners-up: 2005

References 

Association football clubs established in 1999
Association football clubs disestablished in 2006
Home Farm F.C.
Association football clubs in Dublin (city)
Defunct League of Ireland clubs
Former League of Ireland First Division clubs
Former League of Ireland Premier Division clubs
1999 establishments in Ireland
2006 disestablishments in Ireland